Homaloptera ocellata is a species of ray-finned fish in the genus Homaloptera found in Sumatra and Java in Indonesia.

References

Homaloptera
Freshwater fish of Indonesia
Fish described in 1833